Tripyla is a former community in Messenia, Peloponnese, Greece. Since the 2011 local government reform it is part of the municipality Trifylia, of which it is a municipal unit. The municipal unit has an area of 69.696 km2. Population 354 (2011). The seat of the community was in Raptopoulo.

References

Populated places in Messenia